The Main Staff of the National Liberation Army and Partisan Detachments of Serbia was the highest military organ that organized and commanded the units of the Yugoslav Partisans (the "National Liberation Army") on the territory of German-occupied Serbia (central Serbia) during World War II (1941–45).

Established on 4 July 1941 in Belgrade by the Provincial Committee for Serbia (PKS), the following were appointed members of staff: Sreten Žujović as commander (komandant), Nikola Grulović, Filip Kljajić, Branko Krsmanović and Rodoljub Čolaković as members of staff. All staff members left Belgrade on 8 July and entered the territories of Šumadija and Pomoravlje, while PKS stayed in Belgrade. The emergence of the Main Staff was very important for the directing of the Partisan Detachments and District Committees of the Communist Party of Yugoslavia.

See also
Main National Liberation Committee for Serbia
Anti-fascist Assembly for the National Liberation of Serbia

Annotations

References

Sources

 
 
 
 
 
 

Yugoslav Partisans
Serbia in World War II
1941 establishments in Serbia
1945 disestablishments in Serbia
Serbia under German occupation
Communism in Serbia
Communist organizations in Europe